Songs for the Saints is the eighteenth studio album by American country music singer Kenny Chesney. It was released on July 27, 2018 via Warner Bros. Nashville and Blue Chair Records. The album's content was inspired by Hurricane Irma.

Content
The album is Chesney's first release for Warner Bros. Nashville, to which he signed in early 2018. Chesney produced it with longtime producer Buddy Cannon. "Get Along" was released on April 6, 2018 as the first single. Chesney co-wrote five of the twelve songs on the album. Ziggy Marley performs duet vocals on "Love for Love City", Jimmy Buffett appears on a cover of his own "Trying to Reason with Hurricane Season", and Mindy Smith provides backing vocals on "Better Boat". Lord Huron's "Ends of the Earth" is also covered on the album.

According to Chesney, the album was inspired by "the rebuilding process" after Hurricane Irma, which destroyed a house that he owned in Saint John, U.S. Virgin Islands. Proceeds from the album will be donated to Hurricane Irma disaster relief funds.

Critical reception
Annie Reuter of Sounds Like Nashville gave the album a positive review, praising the "heartfelt and vivid lyrics" and the "stripped down and introspective" nature of the album. Newsday reviewer Glenn Gamboa rated it 3 out of 4 stars, stating that "Chesney's artistic stretch may not give him his usual collection of chart-toppers...However, Songs for the Saints is about so much more than that, a way for Chesney to work his way through the aftermath of Hurricane Irma." Stephen Thomas Erlewine of Allmusic rated it 4 out of 5, praising the "warm, hazy vibe" and introspective nature, calling it "one of Chesney's best records".

Commercial performance
Songs for the Saints debuted at number two on the US Billboard 200 with 77,000 album-equivalent units, including 65,000 pure album sales. It is Chesney's 15th consecutive top 10 album in the US.  It sold a further 16,300 copies the second week. As of July 2019, the album has sold 153,900 copies in the United States.

Track listing

Personnel
Sam Bacco - percussion
Eddie Bayers - drums
Wyatt Beard - background vocals
Mark Beckett - drums, percussion
Jimmy Buffett - duet vocals on "Trying to Reason With Hurricane Season"
Buddy Cannon - background vocals
Melonie Cannon - background vocals
Tony Castle - programming
Kenny Chesney - lead vocals
Ross Copperman - background vocals
Chad Cromwell - drums
Eric Darken - percussion
Kenny Greenberg - electric guitar
Robert Greenidge - steel drums
David Huff - programming
Ziggy Marley - duet vocals on "Love for Love City"
Mac McAnally - acoustic guitar, background vocals
Josh Osborne - background vocals
Danny Rader - banjo, bouzouki, acoustic guitar, electric guitar
Jon Randall - background vocals
Mickey Raphael - harmonica
Mike Rojas - Hammond organ, piano, synthesizer
F. Reid Shippen - programming 
Jimmie Lee Sloas - bass guitar
Mindy Smith - duet vocals on "Better Boat"
Derek Wells - electric guitar
John Willis - 12-string acoustic guitar, acoustic guitar, gut string guitar

Charts

Weekly charts

Year-end charts

Certifications

References

2018 albums
Kenny Chesney albums
Warner Records albums
Albums produced by Buddy Cannon